Janus is a genus of stem sawflies in the family Cephidae. There are about five described species in Janus.

Species
These five species belong to the genus Janus:
 Janus abbreviatus (Say) i c g
 Janus compressus (Fabricius, 1793) g
 Janus cynosbati (Linnaeus, 1758) g
 Janus integer (Norton) i c g b (currant stem girdler)
 Janus luteipes (Lepeletier, 1823) g
Data sources: i = ITIS, c = Catalogue of Life, g = GBIF, b = Bugguide.net

References

Cephidae
Articles created by Qbugbot